Dr. Ken is an American multi-camera sitcom that aired on ABC from October 2, 2015, to March 31, 2017. The series was created, written, and co-executive produced by its lead actor, Ken Jeong, who based the concept on his experience as a physician prior to becoming a stand-up comedian. This television show was an ABC Studios/Sony Pictures Television co-production.

On October 20, 2015, ABC ordered a full season of 22 episodes for the first season. On May 12, 2016, the series was renewed for a second season, which premiered on September 23, 2016. On May 11, 2017, ABC cancelled the series after two seasons.

Premise
Dr. Ken is about a Korean-American doctor (Ken Jeong), with a questionable bedside manner; his wife, a talented therapist (Suzy Nakamura); and his two children: son Dave (Albert Tsai) and daughter Molly (Krista Marie Yu).

Cast

Main

 Ken Jeong as Dr. Kendrick "Ken" Park. Ken is a constantly-joking, narcissistic, sometimes-thoughtless general practitioner employed at Welltopia Medical Group. He loves his family and coworkers but is often oblivious to their feelings. He has a younger sister, Dr. Wendi (Margaret Cho), of whom he is jealous. 
 Suzy Nakamura as Dr. Allison Park (née Kuramata). Allison is Ken's intelligent Japanese-American wife and mother to Molly and Dave. She is a trained therapist/psychiatrist and often gives Ken advice about his life. Her children have a tendency to treat her with more respect than Ken. Allison usually tolerates Ken's antics, using them as an opportunity to push him to become a better man, although she occasionally becomes fed up with him.
 Tisha Campbell-Martin as Damona Watkins. Damona is the sassy and loud-mouthed office manager at Welltopia where Dr. Ken works. While she is technically under the jurisdiction of Dr. Park, she is seen as his equal in the office. She develops a sexual relationship with Pat, although she hates herself for it. It is revealed that she controls the schedules and vacation days for the office. 
 Jonathan Slavin as Clark Leslie Beavers. Clark is a registered nurse who works with Ken and is usually his most devoted fan in the office. He is openly gay and prone to speaking in a loud volume when nervous or scared. He is a bit of a drama queen and can overreact to many situations. He is good friends with Damona and Dr. Julie Dobbs. 
 Albert Tsai as Dave Park. Dave is Ken's son, age ten at the start of the series, who is considered "odd" among his peers and family. Though intelligent, he has a number of strange quirks, such as biting people when he feels cornered and conserving water to a drastic measure for the drought. When he is sad, he will eat food without utensils in bed. It is implied numerous times that he is not popular in school. Ken, Allison, and Molly often attempt to bribe him with pizza. 
 Krista Marie Yu as Molly Park. Molly is Ken's daughter, age sixteen at the start of the series, and is a typical American teenager, obsessed with hanging out with friends, texting, and boys, though she is also very studious. She has several love interests throughout the series and has a habit of disobeying her parents. While she often tries to deceive her parents and brother, she does show some affection toward her family. 
 Kate Simses as Dr. Julie Dobbs (season 1). Julie is Ken's protege and a trained doctor, although she is unsure of herself. She speaks in a nervous, high-pitched voice and is referred to as "fragile" by both herself and coworkers. She has a tendency to keep on talking when she's nervous, divulging Ken's secrets. She is an extremely thorough worker, to the point of spending three hours with a patient. On the season 2 premiere, it was revealed that she left the hospital to do a medical internship elsewhere. 
 Dave Foley as Pat Hein. Ken's boss and the manager at Welltopia, Pat is an insensitive and slightly racist man who often is the butt of the joke. Although he considers himself a benevolent dictator among his coworkers, he's shown to be duped on several occasions since Ken, Damona and Clark are well aware that Pat frequently has ulterior motives. After separating from his wife, he lives on a boat parked outside her house. He fancies himself as a ladies' man, although he only succeeds in sleeping with Damona.
 Dana Lee as D.K. Park, Ken's stern, traditional father (season 2, recurring season 1). In the season 2 premiere, he starts to live in the Park household, saying his wife In-Sook (Ken's mother) left to visit family in Korea for a year. D.K. later confesses he and In-Sook are divorced. As he started living with his son's family, he gets more flexible in adapting to American cultures, such as being in a relationship with an American woman his age, much to Ken's dismay.

Recurring
 Marques Ray as Juan-Julio, the parking garage attendant at Welltopia
 Alexis Rhee as In-Sook Park, Ken's mother and D.K.'s ex-wife
 Stephen Guarino as Connor, Clark's partner and later husband 
 Jerry Minor as Eric, Damona's boyfriend after she moves on from Pat
 Justin Chon as Jae, Molly's boyfriend in Season 2
 Zooey Jeong as Emily, Dave's brief girlfriend in Season 2
 Gillian Vigman as Megan, Pat's brief girlfriend in Season 2

Guest stars
 Margaret Cho as Dr. Wendi Park, Ken's sister, a talk show host.
 Mehmet Oz as himself
 Will Yun Lee as Dr. Kevin O'Connell
 Joel McHale as Ross
 Danny Pudi as Topher
 Jim Rash as Devon Drake
 Stephen Tobolowsky as Joe
 Ian Chen as Henry
 Randall Park as Gary Chon
 George Wyner as Dicky Wexler
 Jeff Ross as Doug
 Gillian Jacobs as Erin
 Yvette Nicole Brown as Amy
 Rhys Darby as Charles Evans
 Jonathan Banks as Dr. Erwin
 Dan Harmon as himself
 Alison Brie as herself
 Nia Vardalos as Tiffany, Pat's ex-wife

Jeong previously starred alongside guests stars Joel McHale, Danny Pudi, Alison Brie, Gillian Jacobs, Yvette Nicole Brown, Jim Rash and Jonathan Banks on the television comedy series Community. In the episode "Ken's Big Audition", Ken auditions for a fictional version of the show, in which Brie, series creator Dan Harmon, and other Community cast members Erik Charles Nielsen, Danielle Kaplowitz, Richard Erdman and Luke Youngblood also appear.

Episodes

Reception
Dr. Ken received highly negative reviews from television critics. The review aggregator website Rotten Tomatoes reported a 7% approval rating, based on 42 reviews, with an average rating of 2.5/10. The website's consensus reads, "Somebody please get Dr. Ken a doctor; seeking any signs of life. Or humor." On Metacritic, the series has a score of 26 out of 100, based on 20 critics, indicating "generally unfavorable reviews."

Indiewire TV Critic Ben Travers and TV Editor Liz Shannon Miller, both negatively ranked the trailer released for Dr. Ken. Marc Berman of TV Media Insights gave the new series very low odds of survival. During the 2015 Television Critics Association press tour, Ken Jeong defended against a comparison drawn between his series and the ill-fated All American Girl starring Margaret Cho, claiming that he would have more creative control as both a writer and producer of Dr. Ken.

Ratings

References

External links

2010s American LGBT-related comedy television series
2010s American medical television series
2010s American sitcoms
2015 American television series debuts
2017 American television series endings
English-language television shows
American Broadcasting Company original programming
Cultural depictions of American men
Cultural depictions of physicians
Television series about families
Television series by ABC Studios
Television series by Sony Pictures Television
Television series created by Jared Stern
Television shows set in Los Angeles
Television shows filmed in Los Angeles
Asian-American television
American LGBT-related sitcoms